Hyles costata is a moth of the family Sphingidae. It is known from Mongolia and adjacent areas of Russia. There are also records from farther east and south in China (Heilongjiang and Gansu). It is probably much more widely distributed in northern China.

The wingspan is 70–82 mm. In China, adults are on wing in July. In Mongolia and Russia they are on wing from June to August.

The larvae feed on Koenigia (syn. Aconopogon), Polygonum and Rumex species.

References

Hyles (moth)
Moths described in 1851